Jamal Rhoden Stevens (born April 27, 1994, in Great Britain) is a male British sprinter.

Athletics career
In 2018, at Birmingham IAAF World Indoor Championships, Jamal Rhoden Stevens competed in the 4x400m relay. He represented England and competed in the Commonwealth Games, the England Athletics Senior and Disability Championship in the 400m on 2022, times with 45.95.
He was invited to the 2023 United Kingdom Athletics indoor Chanpionship for 400M race along with other athletes. 

He participated in the 4x400m relay with the British team for Yokohama in the 2019, Olympic Games.

Competition record

National Athletics League 2021

Match 4

4 x 400 Metres Relay Men – Final
IAAF World Indoor Championships

References

External links
 

1994 births
British male sprinters
Olympic athletes of Great Britain
World Athletics Indoor Championships medalists
Living people